Charaxes galleyanus is a butterfly in the family Nymphalidae. It is found in the Republic of the Congo.

According to Vingerhoedt it is a synonym for Charaxes etheocles.

References

External links
Charaxes galleyanus images at Consortium for the Barcode of Life paratypes
Charaxes galleyanus white form images at BOLD
Images of C. galleyanus Royal Museum for Central Africa (Albertine Rift Project)

Butterflies described in 1984
galleyanus
Endemic fauna of the Republic of the Congo
Butterflies of Africa